Pennsylvania Route 885 (PA 885) is a  long north–south state highway in the U.S. state of Pennsylvania. It runs from Pennsylvania Route 837 in Clairton north to Interstate 579 in Pittsburgh. The route is entirely within Allegheny County and serves as a connector between the city of Pittsburgh and its southern suburbs.

Route description

Clairton to Oakland
PA 885 starts in the Wilson section of the city of Clairton at the intersection with State Street (Pennsylvania Route 837). From there, the route runs uphill heading southwest as Walnut Avenue before turning north at the west end of Clairton. Outside the vicinity, the route journeys northwest as Clairton Road while traversing a rural and mountainous region of Allegheny County. PA 885 then travels towards the north while passing through the western regions of the borough of West Mifflin. Shortly after becoming a four-lane undivided highway, it bypasses the former Century III Mall to the East.

PA 885 briefly runs concurrent with Lebanon Church Road (Yellow Belt) before bearing north as Lebanon Road where it passes underneath a runway of Allegheny County Airport. North of the airport, it journeys past elevations of up to 1,200 feet before turning northwest onto Mifflin Road. PA 885 then enters the city of Pittsburgh via the neighborhood of Hays as Ashby Street where it meets Pennsylvania Route 837 at an interchange. Shortly after, it crosses the Monongahela River via the Glenwood Bridge and enters the neighborhood of Hazelwood.

In Hazelwood, PA 885 travels northwest as Second Avenue and Irvine Street. In the northern section of Hazelwood, the route turns onto Greenfield Avenue before running beneath the railroad tracks. From there, PA 885 again becomes Second Avenue and parallels the Monongahela River to the south and the Three Rivers Heritage Trail to the north. Upon entering Oakland, the academic and cultural center of Pittsburgh, the route turns north onto Bates Street and right away has an interchange with Interstate 376 (overlapped with US 22 and US 30). PA 885 follows Bates Street before bearing west onto the Boulevard of the Allies.

Boulevard of the Allies

The northernmost segment of PA 885 is designated as the Boulevard of the Allies in dedication of the Allies victory in World War I. The route joins the Boulevard less than a mile west of Schenley Park in Oakland. The route embarks across the Southern sectors of Oakland as a four-lane divided highway. As the route journeys west, it meets Interstate 376 and Forbes Avenue at a partial interchange near Birmingham Bridge. PA 885 then travels along a cliff, parallel to both Interstate 376 and the Monongahela River to the south and enters the Pittsburgh neighborhood of Bluff, also known as Uptown. PA 885 also passes to the south of Mercy Hospital and Duquesne University before ending at a partial interchange with Interstate 579 and the Liberty Bridge in Downtown Pittsburgh.

History
Planning began in the early 1920s for the Boulevard of the Allies, extending east from Second Avenue and Grant Street to Oakland. The first part of the Boulevard of the Allies was dedicated on August 8, 1921, and the entire highway opened to traffic on October 2, 1923, including several viaducts and widenings of the existing Emily Street to a terminus at Wilmot Street and Forbes Avenue. One of the first interconnected traffic signal systems was installed a month later (November 13) on the Boulevard downtown as an experiment. Prior to completion, its cost was reported as $1.6 million per mile, the most expensive road in the world at the time. In 1924, the Boulevard became part of an alternate bypass route of the Lincoln Highway, whose original route used Bigelow Boulevard into downtown; this left the Boulevard at Forbes Avenue (its original terminus), following Beeler Street, Wilkins Avenue, and Dallas Avenue to the main route on Penn Avenue near East Liberty.

U.S. Route 22 and U.S. Route 30 were designated along the William Penn and Lincoln Highways through Pittsburgh in 1926; the Boulevard of the Allies bypass alignment was chosen for both routes. The portion of the road east from Forbes Avenue to Bates Street, still known as Wilmot Street, became a part of PA 885 by 1940. With the completion of the Penn-Lincoln Parkway East in the late 1950s, US 22 and US 30 were moved off the Boulevard, and PA 885 was extended west a short distance to the interchange near the Birmingham Bridge. The construction of I-579 in the early 1960s cut the path of westbound Boulevard traffic into downtown; eventually the PA 885 designation was continued west to this interchange.

Major intersections

See also

References

External links

 Boulevard of the Allies Bridge Project
 Pennsylvania Highways: PA 885
 PA State Route 885 Ends

885
Transportation in Allegheny County, Pennsylvania
U.S. Route 22
U.S. Route 30